Gabriel Vlad (born April 9, 1969 in Bucharest) is a former Romanian former rugby union football player. He played as a prop.

Club career
During his career Vlad played for Romanian club RC Grivița. He also played in France for RC Narbonne.

International career
Vlad gathered 30 caps for Romania, from his debut in 1991 to his last game in 1998. He scored 1 try during his international career, 5 points on aggregate. He was a member of his national side for the 2nd and 3rd Rugby World Cups in 1991 and 1995 and played 5 group matches without scoring.

Honours
Rugby Club Grivița
 Divizia Națională: 1992-93

References

External links

1969 births
Living people
Romanian rugby union players
Romania international rugby union players
Rugby union props
Rugby union players from Bucharest
Romanian expatriate rugby union players
Expatriate rugby union players in France
Romanian expatriate sportspeople in France
RC Narbonne players